Kasymkhan Talasbayev (Russian: Касымхан Таласбаев; born 27 February 1993 in Kazakhstan) is a Kazakhstani footballer.

References

Kazakhstani footballers
Living people
Association football midfielders
1993 births
FC Kairat players
FC Kyzylzhar players
Viljandi JK Tulevik players